Staci Nicole Wilson (born July 8, 1976) is an American soccer player and Olympic champion. She is an alumna of Thomas Jefferson High School for Science and Technology (Alexandria, Virginia) and the University of North Carolina.

She received a gold medal at the 1996 Summer Olympics in Atlanta.

Wilson was an All-American soccer player during high school in Virginia. She was a dominant defensive player as a member of the North Carolina Tar Heels women's soccer team. There, among other honors, she was the 1994 National Freshman Player of the Year. In March 2001, the team retired Wilson's jersey number 27.

In March 2012 Wilson became an assistant coach for women's soccer at Florida Atlantic University.

References

External links
 
 
 
 Flint Hill Taps Wilson for Girls Soccer
 Staci Wilson at Virginia–D.C. Soccer Hall of Fame
 Staci Wilson was a star for North Carolina and U.S. women's soccer teams. Now she has Pine School in the state semifinal
 Staci Wilson on coaching high school boys, her winning formula, and recalling her mentors

1976 births
Living people
American women's soccer players
Footballers at the 1996 Summer Olympics
North Carolina Tar Heels women's soccer players
Olympic gold medalists for the United States in soccer
Parade High School All-Americans (girls' soccer)
Thomas Jefferson High School for Science and Technology alumni
University of North Carolina at Chapel Hill alumni
Women's association football defenders
Medalists at the 1996 Summer Olympics
United States women's international soccer players
Soccer players from Virginia
Sportspeople from Fairfax County, Virginia
Florida Atlantic Owls coaches
Florida Atlantic Owls soccer
High school soccer coaches in the United States
Philadelphia Independence
Women's Professional Soccer coaches
Raleigh Wings players
USL W-League (1995–2015) players
Carolina Courage players
Women's United Soccer Association players